This is a list of Brazilian Americans, Americans of Brazilian ancestry, including both immigrants from Brazil who have American citizenship or residency, and their American descendants.

To be included in this list, the person must have a Wikipedia article showing they are Brazilian American or must have references showing they are Brazilian American and are notable.

List

Americans of Brazilian descent
 Ana Lucia Araujo, PhD - professor of History at Howard University
 Barbie Ferreira - model and actress
 Blondfire - brother and sister musical act
 Marshall Brickman - screenwriter
 Rudy Mancuso - actor and musician
 Hailey Baldwin - model
 Camilla Belle - actress (Brazilian mother)
 Jordana Brewster - film actress (Brazilian mother)<ref>{{cite web|url=http://www.lesbianation.com/scene/star.cfm?trotterid=271&showinfo=yes|title="The 5'7 American Brazilian actress..."|website=lesbianation.com|access-date=23 April 2018|archive-url=https://web.archive.org/web/20060525030251/http://www.lesbianation.com/scene/star.cfm?trotterid=271&showinfo=yes|archive-date=25 May 2006|url-status=dead}}</ref>
 Antonio Campos (director)
 Lee Chamberlin - actress (Brazilian father)
 Raw Leiba - actor,producer and Athlete (Brazilian mother)
 Lin Chao - biologist and geneticist
 Flavia Colgan - political strategist
Yaya DaCosta - model and actress
Guy Ecker - actor
Jon-Michael Ecker - actor, son of Guy Ecker
 Julia Goldani Telles - actress and ballet dancer
 Breno Giacomini - American football player
 Alésia Glidewell - actress, 1/2 Japanese descent
 Ryan Hollweg - hockey player
 Palestina "Tina" Isa - honor killing victim, daughter of Brazilian Maria Isa, an accomplice to the killing
 Ezra Klein - journalist
 Camila Mendes - actress
 Sophie Michelle - vlogger
 Sergio Rossetti Morosini - Artist, Author, Filmmaker
 Linda Perry - singer
 Bianca Santos - actress, 1/2 Cuban descent
 Garren Stitt - actor
 Vic Seixas (born 1923) - Hall of Fame former top-10 tennis player
 Maiara Walsh - actress
 Isadora Williams - figure skater, competes for Brazil

Born in/lived in Brazil, with American citizenship
 Anitta - Grammy Award-nominee, singer, songwriter, actress and dancer
 Jessie Rogers - pornographic actress
 Walter Afanasieff - Grammy Award-winning record producer and songwriter
 Alessandra Ambrósio - model
 Pedro Andrade - model, actor and journalist
 Morena Baccarin - actress
 Paulo S. L. M. Barreto, PhD - cryptographer, associate professor at University of Washington Tacoma
 Ana Beatriz Barros - model
 Vítor Belfort - former UFC Light Heavyweight Champion
 Lyoto Machida - former UFC Light Heavyweight Champion
 Antônio Rodrigo Nogueira - former Interim UFC Heavyweight
 Royce Gracie - UFC Hall of Famer
 Leandro Barbosa - basketball player
 Bruno Barreto - film director
 Marcelo Coelho - designer
 Walter Salles - film director
 Daniel Benzali - actor
 Gisele Bündchen - model and entrepreneur
 Bob Burnquist - professional skateboarderhttps://articles.latimes.com/2006/aug/04/sports/sp-xdiary4 Los Angeles Times
 Mario Caldato, Jr. - music producer
 Bruno Campos - actor
 Sergio Cariello - comic book artist
 Ana Maria Carvalho, PhD - professor of linguistics at the Department of Spanish and Portuguese, University of Arizona
 Max Cavalera - musician, frontman of Sepultura, Soulfly and Cavalera Conspiracy
 Nelson Cupello - soccer player
Rafael Araujo-Lopes - American Football Player
 Bruce Driscoll - musician
 Lucy D’Escoffier Crespo da Silva - astronomy student for whom asteroid 96747 Crespodasilva was named after
 Guy Ecker - actor
 Sergio Kato - actor, host, comedian and businessman
 Benny Feilhaber - soccer player
 Val Fernandes - soccer player
 Gisele Barreto Fetterman - activist, Second Lady of Pennsylvania
 A. C. Frieden - author
 Bebel Gilberto - singer
 Marcelo Gleiser, PhD - physicist and astronomer, Appleton Professor of Natural Philosophy and Professor of Physics and Astronomy at Dartmouth College
 Ben Goertzel, PhD - former professor of Computer Sciences at the University of New Mexico, researcher of artificial intelligence, visiting faculty at Xiamen University
 Yan Gomes - baseball player
 Carley Gracie - member of the Gracie family
 Rolles Gracie Jr. - member of the Gracie family
Isabelle Greiner, news anchor and journalist
 Bill Handel - radio personality
 Nenê Hilário - basketball player
 Cristiane Justino - MMA fighter, current Invicta FC World Featherweight Champion
 Adriana Lima - model
 Roger Lima - bass guitarist and co-lead vocalist of the ska-punk band Less Than Jake
 Andrew Matarazzo - actor
 Carlos Metidieri - soccer player
 Carmen Miranda - prominent singer and actress from the 40s and 50s
 Fabrizio Moretti - musician, drummer for The Strokes
 Sergio Rossetti Morosini - Artist, Author, Filmmaker
 Naza - visual artist
 David Neeleman - founder of JetBlue Airways; CEO and founder of Azul Airlines
 Miguel Nicolelis, MD, PhD - Duke School of Medicine Distinguished Professor of Neuroscience; Duke University Professor of Neurobiology, Biomedical Engineering and Psychology and Neuroscience; and founder of Duke's Center for Neuroengineering
 Pelé (real name Edson Arantes do Nascimento) - retired professional soccer player; considered the best player of all time
 André Rienzo - baseball player
 Carlos Saldanha - animator and filmmaker, Blue Sky Studios
 Jovino Santos-Neto - musician
 Anderson Silva - UFC Middleweight Champion
 Tiago Splitter - basketball player
 Ed Soares - martial arts businessman
 Robert Rey - plastic surgeon featured on TV series Dr. 90210''
 Rodrigo Santoro - actor
 Lateef Crowder dos Santos - actor and martial artist
 Eduardo Saverin - entrepreneur, co-founder of Facebook
 Roberto Mangabeira Unger, LL.M., S.J.D. - Roscoe Pound Professor of Law at the Harvard Law School (Harvard University)
 Fabrício Werdum - MMA fighter, former UFC Heavyweight Champion
 Maurício Moura, economist, pollster, George Washington University

See also
 Immigration to the United States
 Brazilian diaspora
 List of Brazilian Britons
 Brazilian people
 List of Brazilians

Footnotes

Brazilian Americans

Americans
Brazilian Americans
Brazilian